Delfeayo Marsalis (born July 28, 1965) is an American jazz trombonist, record producer and educator.

Life and career

Marsalis was born in New Orleans, the son of Dolores (née Ferdinand) and Ellis Louis Marsalis, Jr., a pianist and music professor. He is also the grandson of Ellis Marsalis, Sr., and the brother of Wynton Marsalis (trumpeter), Branford Marsalis (saxophonist), and Jason Marsalis (drummer). Delfeayo also has two brothers who are not musicians: Ellis Marsalis III (b. 1964) is a poet, photographer and computer networking specialist based in Baltimore, and Mboya Kenyatta (b. 1970), who is diagnosed with is autism and was the primary inspiration for Delfeayo's founding of the New Orleans-based Uptown Music Theatre. Formed in 2000, UMT has trained over 300 youth and staged eight original musicals, all of which are based upon the mission of "community unity".

Delfeayo has recorded 8 of his own albums and is known for his work as a producer of acoustic jazz recordings. Along with Tonight Show engineer Patrick Smith, Delfeayo coined a phrase that was primarily responsible for the shift in many jazz recordings from rock and roll production to the resurgence of acoustic recording. "To obtain more wood sound from the bass, this album recorded without usage of the dreaded bass direct" first appeared on brother Branford's Renaissance (Columbia, 1987), and became the single sentence to define the recorded quality of many acoustic jazz recordings since the late 1980s. He is a graduate of Berklee College of Music, and in 2004 received an MA in jazz performance from the University of Louisville.

Marsalis, with his father and brothers, are group recipients of the 2011 NEA Jazz Masters Award.

Personal life 
Marsalis was raised Catholic.

Discography

As leader 

 Pontius Pilate's Decision (Novus, 1992) 
 Musashi (Evidence, 1996)
 Minions Dominion (Troubadour Jass, 2006) 
 Sweet Thunder: Duke and Shak (Troubadour Jass, 2011)
 The Last Southern Gentlemen (Troubadour Jass, 2014)
 Make America Great Again (Troubadour Jass, 2016)
 Kalamazoo (Troubadour Jass, 2017) 
 Jazz Party (Troubadour Jass, 2020)

As sideman
With Branford Marsalis
 1992 I Heard You Twice the First Time
 1994 Buckshot LeFonque
 1997 Music Evolution
 2003 Romare Bearden Revealed

With others
 1993 It Don't Mean a Thing, Elvin Jones (Enja)
 1994 The Place To Be, Benny Green (Blue Note)
 1994 Joe Cool's Blues, Ellis Marsalis/Wynton Marsalis
 1996 Hold on Tight, Kermit Ruffins
 1997 Jazzfest, Elvin Jones
 1997 R+B = Ruth Brown, Ruth Brown
 1998 Crackerjack, Clutch
 1999 Citizen Tain, Jeff "Tain" Watts
 2000 Spirits of Congo Square, Donald Harrison
 2000 The Search, Wycliffe Gordon
 2003 The Marsalis Family: A Jazz Celebration, Marsalis Family
 2006 Concrete Jungle: The Music of Bob Marley, Monty Alexander
 2006 Standards Only, Wycliffe Gordon
 2009 Ms. B's Blues, Ruth Brown
 2010 Music Redeems, Marsalis Family
 2016 Trilogy, Ana Popovic

Filmography
 Sound of Redemption: The Frank Morgan Story (2014)
 Soundtrack to The Courage of Her Convictions (documentary about Maureen Kelleher-Activists & Artist) (2016)

References

External links

Delfeayo Marsalis website

Review of Minions Dominion at JazzChicago.net

Jazz musicians from New Orleans
Berklee College of Music alumni
Living people
1965 births
American jazz trombonists
Male trombonists
Jazz trombonists
21st-century trombonists
21st-century American male musicians
American male jazz musicians
Marsalis family
21st-century African-American musicians
20th-century African-American people